Rimbey  is a town in central Alberta, Canada.

Provincially, Rimbey is part of the Rimbey-Rocky Mountain House-Sundre electoral district and federally in the Wetaskiwin riding.

History 
Officially made a community in 1902, the first name given to the settlement at the turn of the century was Kansas Ridge as many of the settlers originated from the American state of Kansas.  Among them were the three Rimbey brothers (Sam, Ben, and Jim) for whom the town was officially named after in 1904.  The Rimbeys moved to Canada from Scott County, Illinois having moved to Illinois in the 1830s from Maryland. They were born in Pennsylvania.

In 1919 the Lacombe and Blindman Valley Electric Railway (later part of the Canadian Pacific Railway) reached Rimbey, and there was much enthusiasm for the "new town" by the tracks (now Highway 20).  Two grain companies built elevators the following year and Rimbey's population swelled to 319 by 1921.

The Second World War brought abrupt changes to Rimbey, as young men and sometimes their families left the village.  When war was over some returned and others did not.  Many new faces came to Rimbey and the population surged to 634 by 1946.

Demographics 

In the 2016 Census of Population conducted by Statistics Canada, the Town of Rimbey recorded a population of 2,567 living in 1,077 of its 1,160 total private dwellings, a  change from its 2011 population of 2,378.

Economy 

Rimbey is mainly a farming community, with the oil and gas sector increasing in importance.

The town has full amenities including hotels, motels, several grocery, convenience, and liquor stores and a campground.  Rimbey has its own hospital and ambulance (although more specialized procedures are sent to Red Deer, Calgary or Edmonton) and its own detachment of the Royal Canadian Mounted Police.

Attractions 
Pas-Ka-Poo Park includes large open lawns, a historical village site, museums and a wide array of interesting displays, including the World's Largest Collection of International Trucks in the Smithson International Truck Museum.

The golf course has since been closed down, due to flooding.

The town had an outdoor swimming pool open from May to September every year, which has been rebuilt as a  junior olympic pool with a beach entrance, two hot tubs, a double loop waterslide and a  splash pad for toddlers up to 15 years of age.

The Beatty House is a historical house in the centre of town and can be booked for tours or to house social events.

There are also a couple of smaller public parks (designed for children) around town.

Education 
Operated by the Wolf Creek School Division No. 72, the Rimbey Elementary School, the Rimbey Junior-Senior High School, and the West Country Outreach School provide education within Rimbey. The town is also home to the Rimbey Christian School, a private school that offers learning for students in K-9. The Rimbey Nursery School offers play-based programs for children 3 to 5 years old.

Media 
The town newspaper is the Rimbey Review. The Review commenced publishing on January 27, 1997 and was owned by Sylvan Lake News. The paper was sold to Black Press in 2005. The Rimbey Review succeeded the Rimbey Record, which had been publishing since the early 1930s. The Record was cited, in 1937, for its assistance in a series for the Edmonton Journal, which won that paper a Pulitzer prize. The Rimbey Record was, at its demise, part of a chain of newspapers, under the banner Record Publishing that failed financially after an unsuccessful attempt to go public. The town had one radio station VF8020 on 93.3 MHz, which was owned by The Church of Nazarene of Rimbey.

Notable people 
Harry Lang, professional wrestler best known as Cowboy Lang
Jeffrey Bowyer-Chapman, actor
Myrna Pearman naturalist and author.

See also 
List of communities in Alberta
List of towns in Alberta

References

External links 

1919 establishments in Alberta
Ponoka County
Towns in Alberta